John Campbell (July 16, 1849 – May 25, 1887) was a merchant and political figure in Nova Scotia, Canada. He represented Digby in the House of Commons of Canada in 1887 as a Conservative member.

He was born in Weymouth, Nova Scotia, the son of Colin Campbell, who was elected to the Nova Scotia assembly, and the great grandson of Colin Campbell, another member of the Nova Scotia assembly. Campbell was educated in Weymouth and at Abbey Park Institution and St Andrews, Fifeshire, Scotland. He operated a business in London, England from 1871 to 1882 and then returned to Nova Scotia. In 1871, he married Emma Harriet Mundy. Campbell died in office at the age of 37.

References 

The Canadian parliamentary companion, 1887 AJ Gemmill

1849 births
1887 deaths
Members of the House of Commons of Canada from Nova Scotia
Conservative Party of Canada (1867–1942) MPs